The Samsung NX 85mm F1.4 ED SSA is a portrait prime lens announced by Samsung on February 21, 2011.

References
http://www.dpreview.com/products/samsung/lenses/samsung_85_1p4/specifications

85
Camera lenses introduced in 2011